The Yorkshire Academy Rams (previously the Yorkshire Rams) are an English American football club, based in Leeds, West Yorkshire. They are currently playing in BAFANL NFC 1 Central.

History
The club was founded in 1986 as the Wakefield Wasps and moved to Huddersfield in 1987 to be based at the Rugby union football club ground, in the Waterloo area. Shortly after they moved to the Fartown Rugby league ground. The club were then renamed to the Huddersfield Rams.

In 1990 the club again moved home to the Leeds road Hockey pitch, in Huddersfield. This venue was short-lived, as 1991 saw a major reorganisation of the club, both to a new and more permanent home at the Dalton based Amateur rugby league football club ground in Moldgreen, also in Huddersfield. In view of the increase of the size of the club's recruiting area this reorganisation also saw the change of the club's name to the Yorkshire Rams.

In 1996 the club moved to more luxurious conditions at the Lawrence Batley Sports Centre at Salendine Nook in Huddersfield. The following year, they moved both venue and home town to the Walton Sports & Social club in Wakefield, The following year due to Health and safety rules the club again moved home to the Westgate Redoubt ARLFC, in Wakefield

After a good season and some sponsorship, in 2004, the Rams found themselves moving to the Rams Stadium, home of the Dewsbury Rams in Kirklees. The club ground was renamed in 2005 to the Tetley Stadium. Again the following year, 2006, saw another move of club venue to the Milnthorpe Green home of Sandal RUFC in Wakefield.

For two years the Rams played their home fixtures at South Leeds Stadium, where they enjoyed an unbeaten record before moving to Leeds Corinthians RUFC.

In 2016, the Rams returned to South Leeds Stadium for the second time.

Stadium
The Yorkshire Rams currently play their home games at South Leeds Stadium.

2008
Saw the Rams improve on their 2007 record (6–4) to a 7–2–1 record while also reaching the Semi Final of the Division 1 playoffs, only to lose to Sussex Thunder.

2009
Had a lot of new recruits join the team, together the team compiled a 5–4–1 record.
The team had their destiny in their own hands going into the final game of the season at Dundee, Knowing that a win would Guarantee them a place in the playoffs, however they eventually lost the game ending their season.

2010

The Rams tried to build on 2009's success and recorded an impressive 7–3–0 record. The Yorkshire Rams shut out Gateshead Senators and Merseyside Nighthawks in impressive displays, but ultimately an increasing amount of injuries would take their toll, as the Rams narrowly lost to the Ipswich Cardinals in the Playoffs prematurely ending an outstanding season.

2011

Play Offs 2011

The Yorkshire Rams drew their old rivals the East Kilbride Pirates in the Quarter Finals of the Division 1 Playoffs. Yorkshire had to travel up to Scotland and could have ended the game early on through default, as East Kilbride failed to have an ambulance present when the game kicked off which resulted in the game being stopped early in the first quarter. Yorkshire however waited 45 minutes for the ambulance to arrive in the name of sportsmanship. Throughout the game both teams led however it was Yorkshire who had edged ahead going into the last quarter by 14–12. East Kilbride, as they did twice in the season, found an extra gear and pulled ahead of the Yorkshire side by 14–26. The Yorkshire Rams ended their season on a high losing to the eventual Division 1 Champions; East Kilbride Pirates.

Although the Yorkshire Rams were defeated in the Quarter Final of the playoffs their national ranking made them eligible for inclusion into the newly formed Northern Premiership. 2012 will see the Yorkshire Rams compete in the top flight of American Football in the UK along with the East Kilbride Pirates, Doncaster Mustangs, the Birmingham Bulls, Leicester Falcons and the Tamworth Phoenix

2012

2019
Yorkshire Academy Rams

After parting ways with HC David Pawson, the Rams underwent a merger with Leeds University to form The Yorkshire Academy of American Football. This ongoing alignment helps create a player pathway from grassroots to adult contact disciplines. 
As part of the merger The Rams with be sporting purple horns during the 2019 season and have adopted the academy as part of the team name as well as a logo redesign.

References

External links
 Official club website
 British American Football Association National Leagues (BAFANL)

American football teams in England
Sport in Leeds
1986 establishments in England
American football teams established in 1986